Proud Mary is a 2018 American  action thriller film directed by Babak Najafi, from a screenplay written by John S. Newman and Christian Swegal. The film stars Taraji P. Henson, Jahi Di'Allo Winston, Billy Brown, Danny Glover, Neal McDonough, Xander Berkeley, Margaret Avery, and follows an assassin who must look after a young teenaged boy after a hit job goes wrong.

Proud Mary was released on January 12, 2018, by Screen Gems, which was also the film's production company. Upon release, the film received negative reviews from critics and grossed $21 million.

Plot
In Boston, assassin Mary Goodwin kills her target Marcus Miller in his apartment. Before leaving, she notices Marcus’ young son Danny in his room, oblivious to her presence. A year later, Danny – unaware Mary has been keeping an eye on him – is working for a drug dealer who calls himself Uncle. When a customer, Jerome, tries to short him, Danny pulls a gun and takes the full payment. He buys himself food and delivers the money to Uncle, who beats him for taking a portion of the money. Dazed, Danny rests on a bench, but a man steals his bag, forcing Danny to chase him and fire in the air. The thief drops the bag, but Danny faints and is found by Mary.

Danny awakens in Mary's home, and she offers him food and first aid. Noticing the marks from Uncle's abuse, Mary confronts the dealer, but she is forced to kill Uncle and his men. Leaving Danny at her apartment, Mary attends a meeting with her associates Tom, Walter, and their employer, mob boss Benny Spencer. They meet with Luka, who is Uncle's uncle and head of a rival mob, and assure him that they had nothing to do with Uncle's death. Mary encourages Benny's suspicion that Walter was responsible for eliminating Uncle and his crew, and Benny instructs her to kill Walter. Discovering Mary's cache of guns, Danny opens up to Mary about his life, unaware she is his father's killer.

Mary follows Walter on his routine jog and kills him. Luka sends his men to ambush Benny, killing several members of his crew. Determined to retaliate, Tom – Benny's son and Mary's ex-boyfriend – visits Mary's apartment and questions Danny. Tom tortures one of Luka's men, learning of an upcoming meeting of Luka and his crew, and Benny invites Mary to bring Danny to his wife Mina's birthday dinner. Buying Danny new clothes, Mary tells him about her similar childhood and coaches him on what to say to Benny, warning that he is not to be trusted. At the dinner, Mary tells Benny that she wants to leave her criminal life behind, and Tom confronts her, having deduced that Danny is Marcus’ son.

Mary tells Danny to start a new life elsewhere with her stash of money, should anything happen to her. Before Tom and Mary storm Luka's hideout, he warns her that Benny will not let her leave his crew alive as she knows too much. The two kill Luka's entire crew, but Mary is wounded in the attack and they fail to find Luka. Refusing Tom's help, Mary returns home and tells a shaken Danny that Benny will never release her. Danny goes to Benny's office – where he is spotted by Jerome, who works for Benny – and demands that Mary be allowed to move on, holding Benny at gunpoint. Having learned Danny's true identity from Tom, Benny tells Danny the truth about his father's death and takes the gun, but Mary appears. Sending Danny away, she pleads with Benny to let her go, but he cruelly refuses, declaring that she must train Danny as an assassin. Mary kills Benny and escapes unseen.

Tom learns from Jerome that Danny was the last person seen with Benny. Mary finds Danny and shares her remorse for his father's death, promising to keep him safe. While Mary returns to her apartment, Danny is captured by Tom's men and brought to him. He confirms that Mary killed his father and informs her that he has Danny. She arrives to save him, single-handedly killing all his men. Freeing Danny, she and Tom find themselves in a standoff, but Mary walks away. Tom fires at her, and Mary shoots him in the chest, finishing him off with a bullet to the head. Outside, Mary reunites with Danny; as the credits roll, they drive away to a new life together.

Cast
 Taraji P. Henson as Mary Goodwin
 Jahi Di'Allo Winston as Danny
 Billy Brown as Tom Spencer
 Danny Glover as Benny Spencer
 Xander Berkeley as Uncle
 Neal McDonough as Walter
 Margaret Avery as Mina
 Rade Serbedzija as Luka
 Erik LaRay Harvey as Reggie

Production
In January 2017, Taraji P. Henson signed on to star in Proud Mary with Screen Gems still looking to secure a director for an April 2017 principal production start in Boston. In February 2017, the film received a January 26, 2018, release date and Babak Najafi signed on to direct.

On April 5, 2017, the rest of the cast was announced as the film commenced principal production. On July 20, 2017, the first official trailer for the film was released along with a teaser poster. A new release date of January 12, 2018, was also confirmed.

Release

Box office
In the United States and Canada, Proud Mary was released on January 12, 2018, alongside The Commuter and Paddington 2, as well as the wide expansion of The Post, and was projected to gross around $20 million from 2,125 theaters in opening weekend. It made $3.2 million on its first day and $10 million over the weekend, finishing 8th at the box office and last among the new releases.

Critical response
The website's critical consensus reads, "Proud Mary proves Taraji P. Henson has more than enough attitude and charisma to carry an action movie—just not, unfortunately, one this indifferently assembled." On Metacritic, the film has a weighted average score of 35 out of 100, based on 23 critics, indicating "generally unfavorable reviews". Audiences polled by CinemaScore gave the film an average grade of "B+" on an A+ to F scale.

Odie Henderson of RogerEbert.com praised Henson's portrayal as the title character and the performances from Winston, Brown and Glover, but criticized the production for supplying the film with "awful cinematography" for the actors and "problematic" editing in both the action and dramatic scenes, concluding that: "I am giving a mild thumbs down here, but if you're a fan of Ms. Henson, don't let me stop you from seeing this. Hell, if you make it a hit, perhaps Screen Gems will do its damn job next time." Glenn Kenny of The New York Times also praised Henson for her subtle delivery of the titular character but felt the script doesn't give her enough material to fully display her actions. Devan Coggan of Entertainment Weekly gave the film an overall C+ grade, calling it a "paint-by-numbers B-movie" that's occasionally elevated by Henson bringing "haunted intensity" to her title role, saying that "Proud Mary could've been an enjoyable guilty pleasure [...]  but its stale script and baffling directorial choices hold it back." Rolling Stones Peter Travers criticized Najafi's direction of a "rote script" that lacks emotional connection between its characters and bringing nothing new to the "reformed menace trope" done better in Gloria and Léon: The Professional, concluding that: "It's one thing to watch Henson's Mary shoot her way out of a world of trigger-happy male oppressors. It's another to watch her continually get shot down by a movie that's not worth her time – or yours. It should be ashamed of itself."

See also
 List of black films of the 2010s

References

External links
 

2018 films
2018 action thriller films
2010s American films
2010s English-language films
American action thriller films
Blaxploitation films
Films about assassinations
Films about organized crime in the United States
Films about orphans
Films directed by Babak Najafi
Films set in Boston
Films shot in Boston
Screen Gems films